New Order are  an English rock band formed in 1980 by vocalist and guitarist Bernard Sumner, bassist Peter Hook and drummer Stephen Morris. The members regrouped after the disbandment of their previous band Joy Division due to the death by suicide of lead singer Ian Curtis. They were joined by Gillian Gilbert on keyboards later that year. New Order's integration of post-punk with electronic and dance music made them one of the most acclaimed and influential bands of the 1980s. They were the flagship band for Manchester-based independent record label Factory Records and its nightclub The Haçienda, and they worked in long-term collaboration with graphic designer Peter Saville.

While the band's early years were overshadowed by the legacy of Joy Division, their experience of the early 1980s New York club scene saw them increasingly incorporate dance rhythms and electronic instrumentation into their work. Their 1983 hit "Blue Monday" became the best-selling 12-inch single of all time and a popular club track. In the 1980s, they released successful albums such as Power, Corruption & Lies (1983), Technique (1989), and the singles compilation Substance (1987). They disbanded in 1993 to work on individual projects before reuniting in 1998. In the years since then New Order has gone through various hiatuses and personnel changes, most prominently the departure of Hook in 2007 due to personal disputes with the other members.  In 2015 they released their tenth studio album, Music Complete.  In 2023, both Joy Division and New Order were nominated as one act for the Rock and Roll Hall of Fame.

History

Origins and formation: 1977–1980

Between 1977 and 1980, Ian Curtis, Peter Hook, Stephen Morris, and Bernard Sumner were members of the post-punk band Joy Division, often featuring heavy production input from producer Martin Hannett. Curtis commited suicide on 18 May 1980, the day before Joy Division were scheduled to depart for their first American tour, and prior to the release of the band's second album, Closer. The rest of the band decided soon after Curtis's death that they would carry on. Prior to his death, the members had agreed not to continue under the Joy Division name should any one member leave. On 29 July 1980, the still unnamed trio debuted live at Manchester's Beach Club. Rob Gretton, the band's manager for over 20 years, is credited for having found the name New Order in an article in The Guardian titled "The People's New Order of Kampuchea". The band adopted this name, despite its previous use for former Stooge Ron Asheton's band The New Order. The group states that the name New Order (as was also the case with "Joy Division") does not draw a direct line to National Socialism or Fascism.

The band rehearsed with each member taking turns on vocals. Sumner ultimately took the role, as he could sing when he wasn't playing his guitar. They wanted to complete the line-up with someone they knew well, and whose musical skill and style was compatible with their own. Gretton suggested Morris's girlfriend Gillian Gilbert, and she was invited to join the band in early October 1980 as keyboardist and guitarist. Her first live performance with the band occurred at The Squat in Manchester on 25 October 1980.

Movement: 1981–1982
The initial release as New Order was the single "Ceremony", backed with "In a Lonely Place". These two songs were written in the weeks before Curtis died by suicide.  With the release of Movement in November 1981, New Order initially started on a similar route as their previous incarnation, performing dark, melodic songs, albeit with an increased use of synthesisers. The band viewed the period as a low point, as they were still reeling from Curtis' death. Hook commented that the only positive thing to come out of the Movement sessions was that producer Martin Hannett had showed the band how to use a mixing board, which allowed them to produce records by themselves from then on. More recently, Hook indicated a change of heart: "I think Movement gets a raw deal in general really – for me, when you consider the circumstances in which it was written, it is a fantastic record."

New Order visited New York City again in 1981, where the band were introduced to post-disco, freestyle and electro. The band had taken to listening to Italian disco to cheer themselves up, while Morris taught himself drum programming. The singles that followed, "Everything's Gone Green" and "Temptation", saw a change in direction toward dance music.

The Haçienda, Factory Records' own nightclub (largely funded by New Order) opened in May 1982 in Manchester and was even issued a Factory catalogue number: FAC51. The opening of UK's first ever superclub was marked by a nearly 23-minute instrumental piece originally entitled "Prime 5 8 6", but released 15 years later as "Video 5 8 6". Composed primarily by Sumner and Morris, "Prime 5 8 6"/"Video 5 8 6" was an early version of "5 8 6" that contained rhythm elements that would later surface on "Blue Monday" and "Ultraviolence".

Power, Corruption & Lies: 1983–1984

Power, Corruption & Lies, released in May 1983, was a synthesiser-based outing and a dramatic change in sound from Joy Division and the preceding album, although the band had been hinting at the increased use of technology during the music-making process for a number of years then, including their work as Joy Division. Starting from what earlier singles had hinted, this was where the band had found their footing, mixing early techno music with their earlier guitar-based sound and showing the strong influence of acts like Kraftwerk and Giorgio Moroder. Even further in this direction was the electronically sequenced, four-on-the-floor single "Blue Monday". Inspired by Klein + M.B.O.'s "Dirty Talk" and Sylvester's disco classic, "You Make Me Feel (Mighty Real)", "Blue Monday" became the best-selling independent 12" single of all time in the UK; however, (much to the chagrin of the buying public) it was not on the track list of Power, Corruption & Lies. The song was included however on the cassette format in some countries, such as Australia and New Zealand, and on the original North American CD release of the album, alongside its B-side, "The Beach". "Blue Monday" was also included on the 2008 collector's edition of Power, Corruption & Lies.

The 1983 single "Confusion" firmly established the group as a dance music force, inspiring many musicians in subsequent years. In 1984 they followed the largely synthesised single "Thieves Like Us" with the heavy guitar-drum-bass rumble of "Murder", a not-too-distant cousin of "Ecstasy" from the Power, Corruption & Lies album. KROQ Los Angeles DJ Jed the Fish claims New Order had more to do with the emergence of house music than the Warehouse music of Chicago and "Frankie Knuckles and the whole so-called House music scene. Unless you were actually from regional Chicago, had you ever heard of House music until New Order? Be real, now."

Low-Life, Brotherhood, and Substance: 1985–1987
1985's Low-Life refined and sometimes mixed the two styles, guitar-based and electronic, and included "The Perfect Kiss"—the video for which was filmed by Jonathan Demme—and "Sub-culture". In February 1986, the soundtrack album to Pretty in Pink featuring "Shellshock" was released on A&M Records. An instrumental version of "Thieves Like Us" and the instrumental "Elegia" appeared in the film but were not on the soundtrack album. Later that summer, New Order headlined a line-up that included the Smiths, the Fall, and A Certain Ratio during the Festival of the Tenth Summer at Manchester's G-Mex.

Brotherhood (1986) divided the two approaches onto separate album sides. The album notably featured "Bizarre Love Triangle" (a Top 20 hit in Australia and New Zealand) and "Angel Dust" (of which a remixed instrumental version is available on the UK "True Faith" CD video single, under the title "Evil Dust"), a track which marries a synth break beat with Low-Life-era guitar effects. While New Order toured North America with friends Echo & the Bunnymen, the summer of 1987 saw the release of the compilation Substance, which featured the new single "True Faith". Substance was an important album in collecting the group's 12-inch singles onto CD for the first time and featured new versions of "Temptation" and "Confusion"—referred to as "Temptation '87" and "Confusion '87". A second disc featured several of the B-sides from the singles on the first disc, as well as additional A-sides "Procession" and "Murder". The single, "True Faith", with its surreal video, became a hit on MTV and the band's first American top 40 hit. The single's B-side, "1963"—originally planned on being the A-side until the group's label convinced them to release "True Faith" instead—would later be released as a single in its own right several years later, with two new versions.

In December 1987, the band released a further single, "Touched by the Hand of God", with a Kathryn Bigelow-directed video parodying glam-metal. The song was one of four new tracks recorded for the American comedy film Salvation!, and reached number 20 on the UK Singles Chart and number 1 in the UK Independent Singles chart. However, it would not appear on an album until the 1994 compilation The Best of New Order.

Technique, Republic and first break-up: 1988–1993
By this time, the group was heavily influenced by the Balearic sounds of Ibiza, which were making their way into the Haçienda. Partly recorded at Mediterranean Sound studios on Ibiza, Technique was released in February 1989. The album entered the charts at number one in the UK and contained a mix of acid house influence (as on opening track "Fine Time") and a more traditional rock sound (as on the single "Run 2"). The album is a blend of upbeat, accessible music coupled with blunt, poignant lyrics. During the summer of 1989, New Order supported Technique by touring with Public Image Ltd, Throwing Muses and the Sugarcubes across the United States and Canada in what the press dubbed the "Monsters of Alternative Rock" tour. Around this time, band members also began side projects including Electronic (Sumner with Johnny Marr) and Revenge (Hook with Davyth Hicks). Morris and Gilbert began to work together on outside TV theme production work. In 1991, the band were sued by the publishing company of American singer John Denver, who alleged that the guitar break in "Run 2" was similar to his song "Leaving on a Jet Plane". The case was settled out of court and the song has since been credited to both New Order and John Denver.

In 1990, New Order recorded the official song of the England national football team's 1990 World Cup campaign, "World in Motion", under the ad hoc band name EnglandNewOrder. The song, co-written with comedian Keith Allen, was the band's sole number one UK hit. The song was originally planned to be titled "E for England", however the Football Association vetoed the title upon realising that this was a reference to ecstasy; a drug heavily associated with the Haçienda. (Allen claimed that his original draft lyrics included "E is for England, England starts with E / We'll all be smiling when we're in Italy.") The song also featured chanting from members of the England team and Allen, and a guest rap from England player John Barnes. It was again produced by Stephen Hague, who the band chose to produce their next album.

The band's next album Republic was shadowed by the collapse of their longtime label Factory Records. The label had been ailing due to financial difficulties, and was forced to declare bankruptcy in 1992. New Order never had a formal contract with Factory. Although unusual for a major group, this was Factory's standard practice until the mid-1980s. Because of this, the band, rather than Factory Records, legally owned all of their recordings. This has been cited by Wilson himself as the main reason London Records' 1992 offer to buy the ailing label fell through. Following Factory's collapse, New Order signed with London, as did Morris and Gilbert separately for their side project The Other Two, whose debut album was originally intended for release on Factory. Republic, released around the world in 1993, spawned the singles "Regret"—New Order's highest-charting single in the US—"Ruined in a Day", "World", and "Spooky".

Following the release and promotion of Republic, the band put New Order on hold while focusing on side projects; with The Other Two's debut album released in 1993. In 1994, a second singles collection was released, entitled The Best of New Order. It featured all of the band's singles since Substance as well as a few extra tracks: "Vanishing Point" (from 1989's Technique), "The Perfect Kiss", "Thieves Like Us", "Shellshock", and remixes of "True Faith", "Bizarre Love Triangle", "1963", and "Round & Round". The new versions of "True Faith" and "1963" (the latter as a more guitar-oriented version produced by Arthur Baker) were released as singles to promote the album. In the US, the track listing was altered to set it apart from Substance as well as the UK release of The Best of New Order which had been available months prior. This collection was followed by a remix album, The Rest of New Order, featuring a selection of existing and newly commissioned mixes of classic New Order tracks. Some versions contained an extra disc or cassette composed entirely of remixes of "Blue Monday". "Blue Monday" was released as a single for a third time to promote the collection.

Reformation and Get Ready: 1998–2003
The group reconvened in 1998 at the suggestion of Rob Gretton. Nearly five years had passed since they had last seen each other. Sumner said, "We decided before we agreed to doing any gig, to have a meeting, and if anyone had any grudges to bear, to iron them out." By the second meeting everyone agreed to continue playing, scheduling their reunion gig for the Phoenix Festival that same year. In addition to rarer songs, New Order also decided to begin playing Joy Division songs again. When the Phoenix Festival was cancelled due to low ticket sales, New Order instead played the last night of that year's Reading Festival.

Their 2001 release Get Ready largely departed from their more electronic style and focused on more guitar oriented music. According to Sumner, "Get Ready was guitar-heavy simply because we felt that we'd left that instrument alone for a long time." Longtime fan Billy Corgan of the Smashing Pumpkins played guitar and sang back-up on the track "Turn My Way," and in 2001 toured with the band on dates in the UK, US, and Japan for a short period of time. Phil Cunningham (formerly of Marion) joined the band in a live capacity, deputising for Gilbert who declined to tour in favour of caring for her and Morris' children. Primal Scream's Bobby Gillespie provided vocals on the track "Rock the Shack". Singles from the album included "Crystal," "60 Miles an Hour" and Someone Like You."

In 2002, Q featured New Order on their list of the "50 Bands to See Before You Die", although this was as part of a sub-list of "5 Bands That Could Go Either Way". Both New Order and Joy Division were portrayed in the Michael Winterbottom film 24 Hour Party People, depicting the rise and fall of Factory Records as seen through the eyes of label founder Tony Wilson. Cameos by Wilson himself, along with Mark E. Smith of the Fall and former members of Happy Mondays and Inspiral Carpets, lent a degree of legitimacy to the proceedings. The film touched on some of Factory's other artists, including Happy Mondays and the Durutti Column. The soundtrack featured the new track "Here to Stay," produced by the Chemical Brothers, which was released as a single. The single's music video highlighted scenes taken from the film.

Waiting for the Sirens' Call, Singles and second break-up: 2004–2007

The band released a new album on 27 March 2005, titled Waiting for the Sirens' Call, their first with new member Phil Cunningham. Cunningham replaced Gilbert (now married to Morris) so she could look after their children. Singles from this album were "Krafty", "Jetstream" (which features guest vocals by Ana Matronic from Scissor Sisters), and the title track. At the 2005 NME Awards, New Order and Joy Division received the award for "Godlike Geniuses" (for lifetime achievement). Previous winners include Ozzy Osbourne, the Clash, and Happy Mondays. In 2006 the album track "Guilt Is a Useless Emotion" was nominated for a Grammy Award in the category of Best Dance Recording.

In the autumn of 2005, the group released another greatest hits compilation, in the form of Singles. The two-disc release was an updated version of the Substance collection and contained every single released from their 1981 debut all the way through to "Waiting for the Sirens' Call". However, unlike Substance, which focused almost exclusively on the 12" versions of the group's singles, Singles collected the 7" versions, many of which (like "Ceremony", "Temptation" and "Confusion") had never been released on CD. The album was accompanied by a two-disc DVD set, titled Item, that collected the extended UK version of NewOrderStory with a DVD of all New Order music videos as well as two newly commissioned videos for "Temptation '87" and "Ceremony".

The New Order: Live in Glasgow DVD was recorded at the Glasgow Academy in 2006 and features 18 tracks, including 4 Joy Division songs. Next to that, the release also contains a bonus disc of footage from the band's personal archive including 1980s footage from Glastonbury (June 1981), Rome, Cork, Rotterdam and Toronto.

In 2006, the band played several one-off live dates as well as short tours in the UK, Brazil and Argentina. After their Buenos Aires show in November 2006, Peter Hook suggested that the band should stop touring. In early May 2007, Hook was interviewed by British radio station XFM – originally to talk about his contribution to the debut album of Jane's Addiction singer Perry Farrell's new band Satellite Party – and stated that "Me and Bernard aren't working together." Further complicating the news, NewOrderOnline, a website with support from New Order management, reported that according to "a source close to the band", "The news about the split is false... New Order still exists despite what [Hook] said ... Peter Hook can leave the band, but this doesn't mean the end of New Order." However, Sumner revealed in 2009 that he no longer wished to make music as New Order.

Reunion with new line-up, Lost Sirens and Music Complete: 2011–2016
In September 2011, the band announced that they would perform for the first time since 2006, at the Ancienne Belgique, Brussels on 17 October and at the Bataclan, Paris on 18 October. The band's line-up included keyboardist Gillian Gilbert, who returned to the band after a ten-year break, and Bad Lieutenant bassist Tom Chapman in place of Peter Hook. They played subsequent shows in London and South America in December, and released Live at the London Troxy, a live album from their performance on 10 December 2011 at The Troxy in London.

They continued to tour throughout 2012, including a short tour of New Zealand and Australia in February/March, and several festival appearances in 2012. New Order performed at Hyde Park with Blur and the Specials to celebrate the 2012 Summer Olympics closing ceremony.

Lost Sirens was released in the United Kingdom on 14 January 2013. Lost Sirens is an eight-track album of songs recorded during the sessions for Waiting for the Sirens' Call. The album was discussed by Gillian Gilbert in a Brazilian interview to promote the band's appearance in São Paulo. She acknowledged issues with former member Peter Hook, and stated there was "a lot going on behind the scenes on the copyright" delaying the release.

The band debuted their first new song since the Waiting for the Sirens' Call sessions, "Singularity", during Lollapalooza Chile in March 2014. In July, the group toured North America, where they debuted another song, "Plastic". On 2 September the band signed to Mute Records. The New Order back catalogue remains with Warner Music.

On 22 September 2015, the band released a new album, Music Complete, their first without Peter Hook. The album was produced mostly by the band themselves, except "Singularity" and "Unlearn This Hatred", both produced by Tom Rowlands, while "Superheated" features additional production by Stuart Price.

On 13 May 2016, New Order released a follow-up remix album Complete Music, which consists of extended and reworked mixes of each track from Music Complete.

In November 2015, Peter Hook sued Bernard Sumner, Stephen Morris and Gillian Gilbert. In an objection, it was revealed that Sumner, Morris and Gilbert had set up a new company behind Hook's back, that it has generated an income of £7.8 million in four years while Hook received only a fraction of that. The three members argued they had treated Hook fairly and that his stake in the band's royalties was reasonable, despite the fact that in four years, Hook had only received "1.25 per cent of the band's royalties and other income from merchandising and performances". The judge ruled that there was "at least a reasonable prospect" of Hook proving that he was not getting a fair share of royalties and other income and rejected Sumner and Morris's lawyer argument. The judge was willing to hear the case but urged the parties to come to an agreement rather than suffer legal costs of around £900,000. On 20 September 2017, the band announced that a full and final settlement had been reached in the dispute.

Touring and recent work: 2017–present
On 13 July 2017, New Order played a concert at Manchester International Festival with Liam Gillick. On 12 July 2019 the performance was released as a live album titled Σ(No,12k,Lg,17Mif) New Order + Liam Gillick: So it goes.. (Live at MIF). The collaboration between Gillick and New Order was the subject of a documentary feature titled 'New Order: Decades', directed by Mike Christie and broadcast in the UK by Sky Arts and Showtime in the USA.

On 23 August 2018, the band played the first date of a North American tour at the Palace Theatre in St. Paul Minnesota, US. According to the band's official website, other stops on the tour included Cleveland, Ohio; Washington, DC; Toronto, Ontario; Long Beach, California; Kahului, Hawaii; and Honolulu, Hawaii. As of 24 August 2018, a single show in Santiago, Chile had been announced for 21 November 2018.

In January 2020, the band played a four night residency in Florida, and in February 2020, they announced a co-headlining tour in North America with the Pet Shop Boys, and that the only concert in the UK in 2020 would be at The O2 on 10 October. These tour dates were later rescheduled for 2021.

On 8 September 2020 the band released the single "Be a Rebel" 5 years after their previous release. A music video for the single, directed by NYSU, premiered on YouTube on 2 December.

On 11 February 2021, the band announced their plans to release a live album and concert film of their 2018 show at London's Alexandra Palace, directed by Mike Christie. Entitled Education Entertainment Recreation (Live at Alexandra Palace), it was released on 7 May.

New Order kicked-off their Unity Tour (with the Pet Shop Boys) on 17 September 2022. The tour consisted of 13 dates in the United States and Canada.

Other projects

In 1988, Bernard Sumner teamed up with former Smiths guitarist Johnny Marr to form the group Electronic, also enlisting the help of Neil Tennant and Chris Lowe of the Pet Shop Boys. Electronic regrouped in 1996 for Raise the Pressure, which also featured Karl Bartos (formerly of Kraftwerk). The project's third album Twisted Tenderness was released in 1999 after which the band dissolved.

In June 2009, Sumner formed a new band called Bad Lieutenant with Phil Cunningham (guitar) and Jake Evans (guitar and vocals). Their album Never Cry Another Tear was released on 5 October 2009. In addition to Cunningham and Evans the album also features appearances by Stephen Morris (drums), Jack Mitchell (drums), Tom Chapman (bass) and Alex James (bass). The live band included Morris on drums and Tom Chapman on bass.

Peter Hook has been involved with several other projects. In the 1990s, Hook recorded with Killing Joke with a view to joining the band. However, original bassist Martin 'Youth' Glover instead returned to the band. In 1995 he toured with the Durutti Column. He has recorded one album with the band Revenge with Davyth Hicks and Chris Jones and two with Monaco (both as bassist, keyboardist and lead vocalist) with David Potts. Monaco scored a club and alternative radio hit with "What Do You Want From Me?" in 1997. Hook also formed a band called Freebass with fellow bass players Mani (the Stone Roses) and Andy Rourke (the Smiths) in addition to vocalist Gary Briggs. Freebass was active from 2007 to 2010. He also contributed to Perry Farrell's Satellite Party. Hook's current band Peter Hook and the Light is touring and performing full albums from both Joy Division and New Order.

In 1990 Gillian Gilbert and Stephen Morris formed their own band, The Other Two. The Other Two released its first single "Tasty Fish" in 1991 and released two albums, The Other Two & You in 1993 and Super Highways in 1999. They have also been involved in scoring television soundtracks, like Making Out. In 2007, Gilbert and Morris remixed two tracks for the Nine Inch Nails remixes album Year Zero Remixed.

BeMusic
"BeMusic" was a name the band used for their publishing company (the LP label for Movement says "B Music" in large letters, though using an italic ß for the letter B). All four members of the band used the name for production work for other artists' recordings between 1982 and 1985.

The first BeMusic credit was for Peter Hook producing Stockholm Monsters in 1982. Other artists with producer or musician credit for "BeMusic" were 52nd Street, Section 25, Marcel King, Quando Quango, Paul Haig, Thick Pigeon, Nyam Nyam, and Life.

Their production work as BeMusic was collected on two LTM Recordings compilation CDs, Cool As Ice: The BeMusic Productions and Twice As Nice (which also included production work by Donald Johnson, of A Certain Ratio, and Arthur Baker).

Influences, style and legacy

New Order's signature tracks such as 1982's "Temptation", 1983's "Blue Monday" and 1987's "True Faith" can be observed blending genres of rock and dance. Founding member Hook stated that the band's shift from playing cold, dark tracks from 1981 to producing electro/rock tracks from 1982 was inspired by the music of German electronic group Kraftwerk, US rock band Sparks who had produced disco/electro-rock music with producer Giorgio Moroder on their No. 1 in Heaven album, and the Moroder/Donna Summer collaboration on "I Feel Love". Along with Kraftwerk, the English bands Cabaret Voltaire, the Human League, and Orchestral Manoeuvres in the Dark (OMD) educated frontman Bernard Sumner that one "could make music without guitars". New Order's collaboration with New York DJ Arthur Baker was inspired by the records' sounds of Grandmaster Flash and the Furious Five and Afrika Bambaataa & the Soulsonic Force.

According to a staff-written AllMusic history, the band are regarded as "the first alternative dance" music group, having "fused icy, gloomy post-punk with Kraftwerk-style synth-pop". They have also been labelled as synth-pop, post-punk, new wave, dance-rock, electronic rock, and electronica.

They have heavily influenced techno, rock, and pop musicians including Moby, and were themselves influenced by the likes of David Bowie and Neu!. They have also influenced electro, freestyle and house.  New Order's Kraftwerk influence was acknowledged by their single "Krafty", which had cover art referencing "Autobahn".

Drummer Stephen Morris plays a mixture of acoustic and electronic drums, and in many cases plays along seamlessly with sequenced parts. All the band members could and did switch instruments throughout gigs, as evidenced on Jonathan Demme's video for "The Perfect Kiss" and the concert videos Taras Shevchenko (recorded in New York, November 1981) and Pumped Full of Drugs (Tokyo, May 1985). During such live gigs, Sumner alternated between guitar, keyboards, melodica and (on the track "Confusion") bass; Gilbert switched between keyboards and guitar, Morris between drums and keyboards, and Hook played both bass and electronic drums. Taras Shevchenko is also notable for the fact all four members of the group have left the stage before the final song, "Temptation", comes to a complete end.

Reputation 
Both New Order and Joy Division were among the most successful artists on the Factory Records label, which was run by Granada television personality Tony Wilson, and partnered with Factory in the financing of the Manchester club The Haçienda. Speaking in 2009, fellow synth-pop musician Phil Oakey described New Order's slow-burn career as cult musicians as being unusually prolonged and effective: "If you want to make a lot of money out of pop, be number 3 a lot. Like New Order did."

Cover artwork
Almost all New Order recordings have minimalist packaging and Peter Saville was the art director. The group's record sleeves bucked the 1980s trend by rarely showing the band members (with the exception of the Low-Life album) or even providing basic information such as the band name or title of the release. Song names were often hidden within the shrink wrapped package, either on the disc itself (such as the "Blue Monday" single), on an inconspicuous part of an inner sleeve ("The Perfect Kiss" single), or written in a cryptic colour code invented by Saville (Power, Corruption & Lies). Saville said his intention was to sell the band as a "mass-produced secret" of sorts, and that the minimalist style was enough to allow fans to identify the band's products without explicit labelling. He frequently sent the artwork straight to the printer, unreviewed by either the band or the label. Their 1983 album, Power, Corruption & Lies, was one of ten classic album covers from British artists commemorated on a UK postage stamp issued by the Royal Mail.

Awards and nominations

{| class=wikitable
|-
! Year !! Awards !! Work !! Category !! Result
|-
| rowspan="3" | 1983
| rowspan="3" | NME Awards
| Power, Corruption & Lies
| Best Dressed Sleeve
| 
|-
| "Blue Monday"
| Best Single 
| 
|-
| Themselves 
| Best Group
| 
|-
| rowspan=2|1988
| Brit Awards
| "True Faith"
| Best British Video 
| 
|-
| rowspan=2|Pollstar Concert Industry Awards
| rowspan=2|Themselves 
| rowspan=2|Most Creative Stage Production
| 
|-
| 1990
| 
|-
| 1991
| Ivor Novello Awards
| "World in Motion"
| Best Selling A Side
| 
|-
| rowspan=3|1993
| Mercury Prize
| Republic
| Album of the Year
| 
|-
| rowspan=2|Billboard Music Awards
| Themselves
| Top Modern Rock Tracks Artist
| 
|-
| rowspan=3|"Regret"
| Top Modern Rock Track
| 
|-
| rowspan=3|1994
| rowspan=2|Brit Awards
| British Single of the Year
| 
|-
| British Video of the Year
| 
|-
| D&AD Awards
| "World (The Price of Love)"
| Pop Promo Video 
| style="background:#BF8040"| Wood Pencil
|-
| 1999
| rowspan=1|Q Awards
| Themselves
| Q Inspiration Award
| 
|-
| 2000
| ASCAP Pop Music Awards
| "Blue Monday"
| Most Performed Song
| 
|-
| rowspan=2|2001
|Q Awards
| "Crystal"
| Best Single 
| 
|-
| Žebřík Music Awards
| rowspan=2|Themselves 
| Best International Surprise
| 
|-
| 2005
| NME Awards
| Godlike Genius Award
| 
|-
| rowspan="2" | 2006
| Grammy Awards
| "Guilt is a Useless Emotion"
| Best Dance Recording
| 
|-
| MTV VMAJ
| "Krafty"
| Best Dance Video
| 
|-
| rowspan=2|2012
| UK Festival Awards
| rowspan="3" | Themselves 
| Headliner of the Year
| 
|-
| Artrocker Awards
| Legend Award
| 
|-
| rowspan="3" | 2015
| rowspan="2" | Q Awards
| Q Outstanding Contribution To Music
| 
|-
| "Restless"
| Best Track 
| 
|-
|Best Art Vinyl
|Music Complete
| Best Art Vinyl
| 
|-
| 2016
| International Dance Music Awards
| "Plastic"
| Best Alternative/Rock Dance Track
| 
|-
| 2019
| Silver Clef Awards
| Bernard Sumner
| Outstanding Achievement Award
|

Band members
Current
 Bernard Sumner – lead vocals, guitars, keyboards, programming, melodica (1980–1993, 1998–2007, 2011–present)
 Stephen Morris – drums, percussion, keyboards, programming (1980–1993, 1998–2007, 2011–present)
 Gillian Gilbert – keyboards, guitars, programming, occasional vocals (1980–1993, 1998–2001, 2011–present)
 Phil Cunningham – guitars, keyboards, electronic percussion (2001–2007, 2011–present)
 Tom Chapman – bass, keyboards (2011–present)

Former
 Peter Hook – bass, electronic percussion, vocals, keyboards, programming (1980–1993, 1998–2007)

Timeline

Discography

 Movement (1981)
 Power, Corruption & Lies (1983)
 Low-Life (1985)
 Brotherhood (1986)
 Technique (1989)
 Republic (1993)
 Get Ready (2001)
 Waiting for the Sirens' Call (2005)
 Lost Sirens (2013)
 Music Complete (2015)

References

Further reading
Hickey, Dec. From Heaven to Heaven. New Order Live. The Early Years (1981-1984) at Close Quarters. London: Dec Hickey, 2012.
Edge, Brian. New Order + Joy Division: Pleasures and Wayward Distractions. London: Omnibus Press, 1988.
Flowers, Claude. New Order + Joy Division: Dreams Never End. London: Omnibus Press, 1995.
Johnson, Mark. An Ideal For Living: An History Of Joy Division. London: Bobcat Books, 1984.
Middles, Mick. From Joy Division to New Order: The Factory Story. London: Virgin Books, 1996.

External links

 
 New Order Online – band-endorsed fansite

 
Alternative dance musical groups
English electronic rock musical groups
English post-punk music groups
English synth-pop groups
English new wave musical groups
British synth-pop new wave groups
Dance-rock musical groups
Brit Award winners
Ivor Novello Award winners
1980 establishments in England
1993 disestablishments in England
1998 establishments in England
2007 disestablishments in England
2011 establishments in England
Musical groups established in 1980
Musical groups disestablished in 1993
Musical groups reestablished in 1998
Musical groups disestablished in 2007
Musical groups reestablished in 2011
Qwest Records artists
Reprise Records artists
Mute Records artists
Factory Records artists
Factory Benelux artists
Musical quintets
Musical groups from Manchester